Megaspiridae is a family of air-breathing land snails, terrestrial pulmonate gastropod mollusks in the superfamily Orthalicoidea (according to the taxonomy of the Gastropoda by Bouchet & Rocroi, 2005).

The family Megaspiridae has no subfamilies.

Genera
Genera within the family Megaspiridae include:
 Callionepion Pilsbry & Vanatta, 1899
 Megaspira Lea, 1838 - type genus of the family Megaspiridae
 Thaumastus Albers, 1860 - synonym: Tholus Strebel, 1909
Synonyms
 Pyrgelix H. Beck, 1837: synonym of Megaspira I. Lea, 1836

References

External links